Felix Jud (1899–1985) was a political activist and German bookseller. He was born in Wilhelmstal and was educated as an ironmonger.

He then worked as a bookseller in the "Frommansche Buchhandlung" in Jena but was fired due to a lack of punctuality. He eventually found another job in a bookstore in Hamburg, where he moved to and worked from 1919.

In 1923 he opened (with his colleague Erna Kracht, who stayed there until 1932) his own store, the "Hamburger Bücherstube", in the Collonaden 104. Although inflation and WWI had impoverished most of the population, he hoped for a better future and trusted in the people of Hamburg, who, he hoped, would help him establish his business.

In 1938, he married Elisabeth Thode. They had three children, two daughters Karen (born 1939), Barbara (born 1941) and a son Michael (born 1943).

The bookstore established itself as an important piece of history for the city; during WWII, Felix Jud, though not Jewish, was ordered to change his last name because it led many to think that he was Jewish. He decorated multiple provocative store windows as well, where, with humour and knowledge, he made fun of Adolf Hitler. For example, he decorated a store window for an anniversary of the store, in which he put a cartoon of a Jew with a photo of Hitler as a baby, one as a confirmand and another current one. The slogan "Jud stays Jud" could be seen under that, in addition to a laundry board saying "Persil stays Persil." He also sold forbidden literature in his store and had connections to the "Weiße Rose" in Hamburg. The business became a meeting point for opponents of the Nazi regime.

On December 18, 1943, he was arrested and sent to the "Polizeigefängnis Fuhlsbüttel" jail for his actions and later, in 1944, transported to the KZ Neuengamme. His trial was with Albert Suhr, Hannelore Willbrandt, Ursula de Boor und Wilhelm Stoldt, who were accused of actions against the Nazi regime as well.

After Germany was defeated, Jud rebuilt his bookstore, first in "Neuer Wall 39", where he was kicked out because the landlord wanted to use the space otherwise. Following this, he was kicked out of his own apartment, because the landlord did not want to have a business in his apartment. Then, he continued rebuilding in the house of the journal "Hamburger Abendblatt" which was offered by a friend, Axel Springer. Lastly, he rebuilt in "Neuer Wall 13", where the store currently stands.

From 1972 Wilfried Weber led the bookstore with Jud and established it further as an art business. .

On August 25, 1985, Jud died at the age of 86. His last words were "Tomorrow is Goethe's Birthday, I would have liked to die then." He called his co-workers on that day and told them that his funeral should be big, since it was his last reclaim. In the Hamburg-Neuallermöhe quarter, there is a street, the "Felix-Jud Ring", named after him.

References 

1899 births
1985 deaths